Music Industry Coalition is a localized volunteer grassroots partnership of music industry professionals, artists, fans and preservationists mainly organized out of  Nashville, Tennessee. The coalition is dedicated to the preservation, nurturing and enhancement of Nashville's musical heritage, culture and community.

The group is actively pursuing the preservation of historical music buildings and areas primarily located in Music Row or the surrounding region in partnership with the National Trust for Historic Preservation. Among the many supporters, rock star Ben Folds and Curb Records founder Mike Curb are included within the group.

Origins

Music Industry Coalition was formed in the wake of the 2014 RCA Studio A developer controversy and its successful preservation thereafter. One of the coalitions pivotal members, Mike Curb, had previously, before the group's founding, been instrumental in preserving the existence of both historic RCA Studio B as well as Quonset Hut Studio. He later relinquished Studio B to the Country Music Hall of Fame.

References

Culture of Nashville, Tennessee
Historic preservation organizations in the United States
Organizations based in Nashville, Tennessee
2014 establishments in Tennessee